Svilile is a village in the municipality of Bratunac, Bosnia and Herzegovina. It is approximately 1.2 km northeast of Nova Kasaba.

History
During the Bosnian War of the 1990s, Svilile, along with all of the Drina Valley, was ethnically cleansed of its Bosnian Muslim population by the Serb-controlled Army of Republika Srpska. The methods of ethnic cleansing included rape, torture, mass murder and forced evacuations. Between 30 June and 2 July 1998, the State Commission on Missing Persons exhumed the remains of 26 Bosnian Muslims in Svilile.

References

Populated places in Bratunac